Maksym Tadeyovych Rylsky (in Kyiv – 24 July 1964 id.) was a Ukrainian poet, translator, academician, Doctor of Philological Sciences.

Biography
Rylsky was born in Kyiv in 1895 in a family of public activist, ethnographer, publicist, member of the "Kyiv Stara Hromada" (Old Community), Tadei Rozeslavovych Rylsky. His early education, young Rylsky received at home. In 1908 he entered the 3rd grade of the Kyiv Private Gymnasium of Volodymyr Naumenko. During his gymnasium period Rylsky befriended with families of Mykola Lysenko and Oleksandr Rusov. In 1915-17 he studied at medical faculty of Kyiv University, with creation of Ukrainian People's University in October 1917, Rylsky transferred to its history and philology faculty.

Due to the Ukrainian–Soviet War, Rylsky left Kyiv in late 1917 and with his brother Ivan worked at food administration in the city of Skvyra, later worked as a rural teacher in villages nearby. In 1918 Bolshevik sympathizers in Romanivka drove Rylsky from his family house, robbed it, destroyed invaluable archive and library of his father.<ref name=tsion>Tsion, V. A son of szlachcic and peasant (Син шляхтича і селянки). Zbruch. 19 March 2015</ref>

Rylsky returned to Kyiv only in 1923 where at first he earned a living as a teacher.

Works
He began writing poems early. His first poem was published in 1907 in a newspaper "Rada", his first collection "At white isles" saw the world in 1910. Already in 1918 his poems "Tsarevna", "On the edge of the forest", collection "Beneath autumn stars" showed that period of internship and "voice sampling" has passed, and his 1922 collection "Blue distance" confirmed it for sure.

The 1920s were marked by the poet's creative flourishing: his collections "Through storm and snow" (1925), "The 13th spring" (1926), "Where roads meet", "Hum and rumbling" (both 1929). In the last of those collections Rylsky arose also as a gifted translator of world poetry i.e. works of Paul Verlaine, Valery Bryusov, Stéphane Mallarmé, Maurice Maeterlinck, and others. The event of cultural and artistic life became a translation of "Pan Tadeusz" of Adam Mickiewicz.

As a representative of the "pure art" doctrine, during the years when the Stalinists adopted the official doctrine of "socialist realism". In 1937 he was involved in rewriting the libretto of Mykola Lysenko's opera Taras Bulba, returning later to neo-classical forms. Maksym Rylsky is one of the most outstanding Ukrainian poets of the 20th century and master of the genres of the modern sonnet and the long narrative poem. He was closely associated with the Neoclassicist group of Ukrainian poets, who employed traditional poetic forms with rhyme and meter, wrote in a clear and accessible contemporary idiom, and often referenced Ancient Greek and Roman mythology as well as numerous other authors from world literature in their poetry.

During the wartime period he wrote two masterful long poems that deviated from socialist realism—"Thirst" (1942) and "Journey to Youth" (1941-4), for which he was again publicly chastised. In 1942 he became Director of the Institute of Fine Arts, Folklore and Ethnography in Kyiv, a post that he held until his death in 1964. The Institute now bears his name. He published some 30 collections of original poetry during his lifetime as well as numerous translations and scholarly works. By 1974 almost five million copies of his works in the original or in translation had appeared in the USSR.

Rylsky joined the Communist Party in 1943 and was a member of the Supreme Soviet of the USSR in 1946.

Language skills and translation

Rylsky was a prolific translator. He had excellent knowledge of 13 languages and all in all could translate from 30 languages of the world. Above all, however, he focused on translating from French, Polish and Russian. 

Awards
Prizes
 Lenin Prize, 1960 – for his collections of poems "Daleki neboskhyly" (1959) and "Troyandy j vynohrad" (1957)
 Stalin Prize, 1943 – for his collections of poems "Slovo pro ridnu matir", "Svitova zorya", "Svitla zbroya", "Mandrivka v molodist"
 Stalin Prize, 1950 – translation into Ukrainian of the poem "Pan Tadeusz" by Adam Mickiewicz

See also
 Rylsky Institute of Art Studies, Folklore and Ethnology
 Maxym Rylsky Museum

References

External links
Rylsky's works in Ukrainian
Koshelivets, I. Maksym Rylsky. Encyclopedia of Ukraine
Solovei, E. Maksym Rylsky (РИЛЬСЬКИЙ МАКСИМ ТАДЕЙОВИЧ). Encyclopedia of History of Ukraine.
Hlibchuk, V. His secret Rylsky took to the grave as he could not last to Ukraine (Свою таємницю Рильський забрав у могилу, бо так і не дочекався України). Halychyna. 21 January 2016

1895 births
1964 deaths
Poets from Kyiv
Ukrainian people of Polish descent
Communist Party of the Soviet Union members
Second convocation members of the Soviet of Nationalities
Third convocation members of the Soviet of Nationalities
Fourth convocation members of the Soviet of Nationalities
Fifth convocation members of the Soviet of Nationalities
Sixth convocation members of the Soviet of Nationalities
Soviet poets
Soviet male poets
20th-century male writers
Translators of William Shakespeare
Taras Shevchenko National University of Kyiv alumni
Full Members of the USSR Academy of Sciences
Stalin Prize winners
Lenin Prize winners
Recipients of the Order of Lenin
Recipients of the Order of the Red Star
Commanders of the Order of Polonia Restituta
Burials at Baikove Cemetery
Ukrainian male poets
20th-century Ukrainian poets